Marcin Wichary (born 17 February 1980) is a former Polish handball goalkeeper. He was a member of the Polish National Handball Team for the Beijing 2008 Summer Olympics.

Sporting achievements

State awards
 2015  Silver Cross of Merit

References

1980 births
Living people
Polish male handball players
Handball players at the 2008 Summer Olympics
Olympic handball players of Poland
Wisła Płock (handball) players
Sportspeople from Zabrze